Lemuel Strutt Tugby Smith (5 June 1880 – 30 December 1927) was an English cricketer who played for Derbyshire in 1909.

Smith was born in Tibshelf, Derbyshire. He made his debut for Derbyshire in the 1909 season in a match against Yorkshire in May, in which Smith scored a few runs and took a single catch. His next and last first-class game followed a week later, in a draw against Sussex.

Smith was a right-handed batsman and played three innings in two first-class matches, making a total of 9 runs.

Smith died in South Kirkby, Yorkshire at the age of 47.

References

1880 births
1927 deaths
English cricketers
Derbyshire cricketers
People from Tibshelf
Cricketers from Derbyshire